Benjamín Callejas (born 2 May 1990) is a Chilean handball player for Balónmano Ovalle and the Chilean national team.

References

1990 births
Living people
Chilean male handball players
Place of birth missing (living people)
21st-century Chilean people
20th-century Chilean people